Euhampsonia niveiceps is a moth of the  family Notodontidae. It is found in north-eastern India, western China and Sumatra.

Notodontidae